Didier Otokoré (born 26 March 1969 in Gagnoa) is a retired Ivorian footballer who played mostly as an attacking midfielder.

Best known for his spell with AJ Auxerre, he spent most of his career in France.

Club career

Otokoré was signed at just 16 by AJ Auxerre, going on to finish his football grooming in the club's youth system, under first-team coach Guy Roux. Never an undisputed starter during his six years in the main squad (tops 23 Ligue 1 matches in 1989–90, mostly as a substitute), he did manage to be relatively used. Also during that season, but in the UEFA Cup, he arguably had his most memorable performance for the club, scoring twice in a 3–1 win at NK Dinamo Zagreb, after a 0–1 home loss.

Otokoré then split 1993–94 with FC Sochaux-Montbéliard and AS Cannes, returning two years later to Auxerre, without any impact. After a couple of seasons in the second level with CS Louhans-Cuiseaux, he took his game to the United Arab Emirates, then returned in 2000 to France, with amateurs FC Bourg-Peronnas, retiring in 2001.

International career
After he had already lived for the requested years in France, Otokoré was eligible to represent France internationally, being summoned for its Espoirs in February 1988; however, a judicial battle between both Football Federations ensued, and the player ended up playing for the Ivory Coast; in his first match, at the 1988 African Cup of Nations, on March 16, against Zaire, he played 60 minutes, being immediately sent home afterwards.

Otokoré also represented his nation at the 1992 edition.

Personal Life 
Otokoré is married to Safia Otokoré, a French politician.

References

External links
 

1969 births
Living people
Ivorian footballers
Association football midfielders
Stade d'Abidjan players
Ligue 1 players
Ligue 2 players
AJ Auxerre players
FC Sochaux-Montbéliard players
AS Cannes players
En Avant Guingamp players
Louhans-Cuiseaux FC players
Al-Wasl F.C. players
Fujairah FC players
Ivory Coast international footballers
1988 African Cup of Nations players
1992 African Cup of Nations players
Ivorian expatriate footballers
Expatriate footballers in France
Football Bourg-en-Bresse Péronnas 01 players
UAE Pro League players
Expatriate footballers in the United Arab Emirates
Africa Cup of Nations-winning players
People from Gagnoa
UAE First Division League players